QH, qh, or q.h. may refer to:

Airlines
 Air Florida (former IATA airline designator QH)
 Bamboo Airways (IATA airline designator QH)
 Kyrgyzstan (airline) (IATA airline designator QH)

Medicine
 ATCvet code QH Systemic hormonal preparations, excluding sex hormones and insulins, a section of the Anatomical Therapeutic Chemical Classification System for veterinary medicinal products
 q.h. or qh, Latin for "every hour" (also q2h "every 2 hours", etc.), an abbreviation used in medical prescriptions

Other uses
 Qinghai, a province of China (Guobiao abbreviation QH)